Giovanni Battagio was an Italian Renaissance sculptor and architect.

A follower of Giovanni Antonio Amadeo, from 1483 he worked on Santa Maria presso San Satiro and other buildings in Milan. He designed the Sanctuary of Santa Maria della Croce in Crema, and the Tempio Civico dell'Incoronata in Lodi, one of the masterworks of the Renaissance in Lombardy.

People from Lodi, Lombardy
15th-century Italian architects
Italian Renaissance architects
Architects from Lombardy
15th-century Italian sculptors
Italian male sculptors
Year of birth unknown
Year of death unknown
Italian Renaissance sculptors